The Sienese Shredder was an annual journal of art, literature, design, poetry, and music that was published between 2006 and 2010. In addition to written and visual content each issue contained an audio CD.

History
The Sienese Shredder was launched in 2006 by New York City-based artists Brice Brown and Trevor Winkfield. They sought to bring attention to artists, art, poetry and writing that had been largely neglected or forgotten. Often this work was completed in the 19th and early 20th centuries. Mark Shortliffe took over as co-editor in 2009 for issue 4.

Each issue brings together poetry, critical writing, visual arts, unpublished rarities, oddball ephemera and other culturally significant material in a way that is exciting, contemporary and fresh. Contents can include writings by visual artists; art by writers; poets as installation artists; photographers as poets, and the range of contributors moves from the well-known and up-and-coming to the unknown or forgotten.

As an archival project, each issue of The Sienese Shredder comes with a CD recording of a well-known poet reading or a musician presenting a retrospective sampling their work. #1 contained an audio CD of poet Harry Mathews reading selected poems he had written between 1955 and 2005. #2 contained an audio CD of poet Charles North reading selected poems he had written between 1970 and 2005. #3 contains an audio CD of music made between 1991 and 2004 by Eric Moe.

Contributors

Alphabetically

 Mitchell Algus
 Christiane Andersson
 Guillaume Apollinaire
 John Ashbery
 Tim Atkins
 Jack Barth
 William Beckford
 Wilson Bentley
 Bill Berkson
 Alan Bernheimer
 Nayland Blake
 Sean Bonney
 André du Bouchet
 Brice Brown
 Francois Caradec
 Nick Carbó
 David Carbone
 Gary Cardot
 Marie Chaix
 Miles Champion
 Susanna Coffey
 David Coggins
 Christophe (Georges Colomb)
 Elaine Lustig Cohen
 Jess (Collins)
 Clark Coolidge
 William Corbett
 R. Crumb
 David Park Curry
 Simon Cutts

 Tim Davis
 Matilde Daviu
 Jean Day
 Willem de Kooning
 Richard Deming
 Edwin Denby
 Robert Desnos
 Thomas Devaney
 Mark Doty
 Denise Duhamel
 David Ebony
 Chris Edgar
 Lance Esplund
 Brad Ewing
 Larry Fagin
 Luigi Ferrari
 Mark Ford
 Elsa von Freytag-Loringhoven
 Michael Gizzi
 Peter Gizzi
 Lanie Goodman
 John Goodrich
 John Graham
 David Gray
 Elliott Green
 Ted Greenwald
 Jon Gregg
 Richard Griffin
 Allan Gurganus
 Rochelle Gurstein

 Jane Hammond
 Paul Hammond
 Hilary Harkness
 Kreg Hasegawa
 Christian Hawkey
 Duncan Hannah
 Mary Heilmann
 Richard Hennessy
 Hannah Höch
 Joris-Karl Huysmans
 Timothy Hyman
 James Jaffe
 Shirley Jaffe
 Malia Jensen
 Jasper Johns
 Don Joint
 Mauricio Kagel
 Nathan Kernan
 Kim Keever
 Jerome Kitzke
 Guy Klucevsek
 Walter Klüppelholz
 Tim Knox
 Louise Kruger
 Nancy Kuhl
 Aaron Kunin
 Erik La Prade
 Alfred Leslie
 Paul Etienne Lincoln
 Guy Maddin

 Gerard Malanga
 Fred Mann
 Virgil Marti
 Harry Mathews
 Bernadette Mayer
 Michael McAllister
 James Meetze
 Marion Meyer
 Melissa Meyer
 Joan Mitchell
 Eric Moe
 Ron Morosan
 Terry R. Myers
 Francis M. Naumann
 Mario Naves
 Michael Neff
 Gérard de Nerval
 Charles North
 Ron Padgett
 Carl Plansky
 Sarah Plimpton
 Mark Polizzotti
 Marcin Ramocki
 Carter Ratcliff
 Rudolph Ruegg
 Frances Richard
 Larry Rivers
 Raphael Rubinstein
 Naomi Savage
 James Schuyler

 Kurt Schwitters
 Iliassa Sequin
 Alan Shockley
 Mark Shortliffe
 Judith Stein
 Adrian Stokes
 David Storey
 Myron Stout
 Arne Svenson
 Karen Swenson
 Barbara Takenaga
 Justin Taylor
 Evelyn Twitchell
 Susan Unterberg
 Charles Vallely
 Paul Verlaine
 Mark Wagner
 Denton Welch
 Lawrence Weschler
 Martin Wilner
 Trevor Winkfield
 Alexi Worth
 Albert York
 Amy Yoes
 Bill Zavatsky
 Scott Zieher
 Pavel Zoubok

External links
 Official site

Annual magazines published in the United States
Defunct literary magazines published in the United States
Contemporary art magazines
Magazines established in 2006
Magazines disestablished in 2010
Magazines published in New York City